Gold Rush! (later retitled California: Gold Rush!) is a graphic adventure video game designed by Doug and Ken MacNeill and originally released by Sierra On-Line in 1988.

Gold Rush! is one of the last games that Sierra made with the AGI interface and is one of the most complicated. The rights to the game are currently owned and published by The Software Farm by its original developers the MacNeills.

Gameplay 
The game is set in 1848, just before the California Gold Rush. The player is Brooklyn newspaperman Jerrod Wilson, who soon receives word that he must go to Sacramento to meet his long-lost brother. After a few minutes of gameplay, word arrives that gold has been found in California, and it becomes much more difficult for Jerrod to settle his affairs in Brooklyn and find a way to Sacramento.

There are multiple paths which Jerrod can take to get to his brother. He can travel on a stagecoach, which is the cheapest path, and the only path that is always available to Jerrod, no matter how long he spends in Brooklyn. This path brings Jerrod into contact with Native Americans, unruly oxen, parching deserts, and the likelihood of a winter storm in the Sierra Nevada. He can also travel by ship to Panama, cross through treacherous swamps and jungles on foot, and then catch another ship to Sacramento. This route is more expensive than the others and also requires Jerrod to prepare carefully for many hazards of the tropical climate of Panama, from malaria to jungle ants to crocodiles. The third and most time-consuming path is to journey all the way around Cape Horn on a ship. This choice has its own perils, from storms to scurvy. On each route, Jerrod can perish at random by a disease for which there is not yet any cure, such as cholera, making it prudent for players to save their game whenever possible and in multiple slots. Once Jerrod arrives in Sacramento, the three routes converge and all of the puzzles are the same. In California, Jerrod must try to prospect for gold, avoid bandits, and locate his mysterious brother.

Copy protection 
Gold Rush! uses words from the official game manual as a form of copy protection. If the player fails to enter the correct word at a certain point during the game, their character is immediately arrested for claim jumping and hanged on the gallows, which is the same as the regular in-game punishment for claim jumping, being caught in someone's hotel room, or stealing.

Reception 
In 1989, Dragon gave the game 4½ out of 5 stars. Computer Gaming World gave the game a positive review, noting it mixes historical simulation with Sierra's traditional adventure gameplay. Compute! called Gold Rush "entertaining, somewhat educational, and a terrific escapade for first-time adventure game players", but warned that its simplicity might disappoint veteran gamers and that the graphics were inferior to that of some other Sierra adventures.

In 2011, Adventure Gamers named Gold Rush! the 96th-best adventure game ever released.

Reviews
The Games Machine (Jul, 1989)
ASM (Aktueller Software Markt) (Mar, 1989)
ASM (Aktueller Software Markt) (May, 1989)
Power Play (Mar, 1989)
Zzap! (Jul, 1989)
Commodore User (Jul, 1989)
Amiga Computing (Sep, 1989)
Amiga Format (Oct, 1989)
Australian Commodore and Amiga Review (Oct, 1989)

Legacy

Collector's edition 
The Software Farm released a collector's edition of California: Gold Rush! in a wooden box in 2000. They also released an economy pack with just the game in an envelope.

Remake 
German game developer Sunlight Games secured the rights and re-released the original version on July 25, 2014. A remake with the name Gold Rush! Anniversary was released on November 7, 2014 for Microsoft Windows. OS X and Linux versions were released later in November 2014. The ports for iOS and Android were released in March 2015. All graphics are pre-rendered, but all animations and characters are displayed in real-time 3D. The game's graphics are in high definition and the music was remade. All text from the original game was optimized with newly recorded voiceovers. The game can be controlled by a point-and-click control or with a parser (only Windows, Linux and Mac), which is similar to the old Sierra games which use the AGI interface. Gold Rush! 2 was released in April 2017 as a sequel to Gold Rush! Anniversary.

Sunlight Games has also released a Special Edition which is limited to 350 copies. The Special Edition comes in a box with a banderole, and the content of the box is similar to the old Sierra boxes is: a copy of the game on a DRM-free DVD, a poster, a card with the serial number, a printed making-of booklet, a printed booklet with concept drawings, and a golden-colored coin. Gold Rush! The Special Edition can only be ordered at Sunlight Games' online shop.

Adventure Gamers gave the remake 1½ stars out of 5. Just Adventure gave the game a rating of B−. 3rd-strike gave the game a 7.0.

References

External links 
 
 Official website for the remake by Sunlight Games
 
 
 Gold Rush! review at Adventure Gamers
 Gold Rush Classic Remake on Steam Store

1988 video games
Adventure games
Amiga games
Apple II games
Apple IIGS games
Atari ST games
California Gold Rush in fiction
DOS games
Classic Mac OS games
ScummVM-supported games
Sierra Entertainment games
Video games set in Panama
Video games set in the 19th century
Video games set in the United States
Western (genre) video games
Video games developed in the United States
Single-player video games